Clinton Prairie Junior-Senior High School is a middle school and high school located  in Frankfort, Indiana.

Athletics

Women's Basketball
In 1999, the Clinton Prairie women's basketball team defeated New Washington to claim the Women's Basketball Class A Indiana State championship. The victory would be the first women's basketball championship for the school.

See also
 List of high schools in Indiana
 Hoosier Heartland Conference
 Frankfort, Indiana

References

External links
Official Website

Public high schools in Indiana
Buildings and structures in Clinton County, Indiana